Sir James Cunynghame, 2nd Baronet (c. 1685 – 1747) of Milncraig, Ayr and Livingstone, Linlithgow,  was a Scottish politician who sat in the House of Commons from 1715  to 1722.

Cunynghame was the eldest son of Sir David Cunynghame, 1st Baronet of Milncraig and Livingstone and  his first wife Isabella Dalrymple, daughter of James Dalrymple, 1st Viscount of Stair. He succeeded his father in the baronetcy on 28 January 1708.

Cunynghame was returned unopposed as  Whig Member of Parliament for Linlithgowshire at the 1715 general election. He was defeated in 1722 and in a later attempt in 1734.
 
Cunynghame died unmarried on 1 February 1747. He was succeeded in the baronetcy by his brother, David, a Lieutenant-General in the Army.

References

1680s births
1747 deaths
British MPs 1715–1722
Members of the Parliament of Great Britain for Scottish constituencies
Baronets in the Baronetage of Nova Scotia